George M. Powers (December 19, 1861 – June 24, 1938) was a Vermont attorney, politician, and judge.  He was most notable for his service as an associate justice of the Vermont Supreme Court from 1904 to 1906, and again from 1909 to 1913, and chief justice from 1913 to 1915 and 1929 until his death.

Early life
George McClellan Powers was born in Hyde Park, Vermont on December 19, 1861, the son of H. Henry Powers and Caroline (Waterman) Powers.  Henry Powers was a prominent attorney who served as an associate justice of the Vermont Supreme Court and a member of the United States House of Representatives.

George Powers was raised in Morrisville, Vermont, and graduated from Peoples Academy.  He served as a messenger for the Vermont Senate in 1872 and 1874.  Powers received his Bachelor of Arts degree from the University of Vermont in 1883.  In 1886, he received his Master of Arts degree from UVM.  Powers studied law with his father and Philip K. Gleed, attained admission to the bar in 1886, and began to practice in Morrisville.

Early career
A Republican, Powers was Assistant Clerk of the Vermont House of Representatives during the sessions of 1884, 1886, and 1888.  From 1888 to 1890 he served as State's Attorney for Lamoille County.  He served as Secretary of the Vermont Senate in 1890, 1892, and 1894.   from 1902 to 1904 he was the Reporter of Decisions for the Vermont Supreme Court.

Career as a judge
In 1904, Powers was appointed an associate justice of the Vermont Supreme Court, replacing Wendell Phillips Stafford, who had resigned in order to accept an appointment as a federal judge.  Powers served until 1906, when his position was eliminated after a newly enacted law reduced the size of the court.

Powers served as a judge of the Vermont Superior Court from 1906 to 1909, when he was again appointed to the Supreme Court, and was succeeded on the Superior Court by Fred M. Butler.  In 1909, he received the honorary degree of LL.D. from the University of Vermont.  In 1913, Powers was appointed to succeed John W. Rowell as Chief Justice, and he served until 1915, when he was replaced by Loveland Munson.

Powers was re-appointed as an associate justice of the Vermont Supreme Court in 1915, and served until 1929, when he was again appointed Chief Justice following the death of John H. Watson.  Powers served as chief justice until his death, and was succeeded by Sherman R. Moulton.

Death and burial
Powers died in Morrisville on June 24, 1938.  He was buried at Pleasant View Cemetery in Morrisville.

Family
Powers was married to Gertrude Woodbury (1872-1962), the daughter of Governor Urban A. Woodbury.  Their children included one son and two daughters; Horace Henry, Mildred Dorothy, and Elizabeth Lillian.

References

Sources

Newspapers

Magazines

Books

Internet

1861 births
1938 deaths
People from Hyde Park, Vermont
University of Vermont alumni
Vermont lawyers
Republican Party members of the Vermont House of Representatives
State's attorneys in Vermont
Justices of the Vermont Supreme Court
U.S. state supreme court judges admitted to the practice of law by reading law
Burials in Vermont